Alan Morton (born 6 March 1942) is an English former professional footballer who scored 28 goals from 94 appearances in the Football League playing as an inside forward for Peterborough United, Lincoln City and Chesterfield.

Football career
Morton was born in Peterborough. He began his football career with Arsenal, but never played for the first team, and made his debut in the 1961–62 Football League season with Peterborough United. In 1963 he moved on to Lincoln City, where he was the club's top scorer in the 1963–64 season with 21 goals in all competitions. He played only infrequently the following season, and moved on to Chesterfield where he finished his professional career, later playing non-League football for Wisbech Town.

References

1942 births
Living people
Sportspeople from Peterborough
English footballers
Association football forwards
Arsenal F.C. players
Peterborough United F.C. players
Lincoln City F.C. players
Chesterfield F.C. players
Wisbech Town F.C. players
English Football League players